Aquilino Villalba Sanabria (born 20 September 1983, in Asunción) is a Paraguayan football striker currently playing for Carabobo.

In 2008, Villalba helped Aurora obtain the Bolivian Championship after scoring three goals in the 2008 clausura finals against Blooming, giving the club its first title in 43 years. Due to his good performance at Aurora, Villalba was signed by Club Bolívar for the 2009 season.

Club titles

References

External links
 Profile at BoliviaGol.com 
 Apertura 2006 Statistics at Terra.com.ar 
 
 

1983 births
Living people
Paraguayan footballers
Paraguayan expatriate footballers
Association football forwards
Club Olimpia footballers
Club Rubio Ñu footballers
Gimnasia y Esgrima de Jujuy footballers
Atlético de Rafaela footballers
Racing de Córdoba footballers
Expatriate footballers in Argentina
Club Aurora players
Club Bolívar players
Club San José players
Expatriate footballers in Bolivia
Paraguayan expatriate sportspeople in Bolivia